Vestergaard  is a Danish surname, literally meaning west farm. Note that the double a is equivalent of å in common nouns and is retained from the pre-1948 orthography in proper nouns only. The form Westergaard is an uncommon cognate. Vestergaard is also a common surname in the Faroe Islands.

Vestergaard may refer to:
Jacob Vestergaard (b. 1961) - Faroese politician
Jakob Vestergaard (b. 1975) - Danish handball coach
Jannik Vestergaard (b. 1992) - Danish athlete in football
Jeppe Vestergaard (b. 1972) - Danish athlete in football
Kurt Vestergaard (b. 1935) - Danish cartoonist ( Kurt Westergaard)
Lene Vestergaard Hau (b. 1959) - Danish physicist
Mette Vestergaard (b. 1973) - Danish athlete in handball
Mikkel Vestergaard (b. 1992) - Danish athlete in football
Søren Vestergaard (b. 1972) - Danish athlete in cricket
Søren Ulrik Vestergaard (b. 1987) - Danish athlete in cricket

See also
 Vestergaard (company)
 Westergaard

Danish-language surnames